Plymouth Argyle Football Club is an English association football club based in Plymouth, Devon. They compete in Football League One, the third tier of the English football league system, as of the 2017–18 season. The club was founded in 1886 as Argyle Football Club. At this time, there was no League football, so matches were arranged on an ad hoc basis, supplemented by cup competitions. In January 1903, the club became a limited company and changed their name to Plymouth Argyle F.C. Election to the Southern League followed in March, as the club gained direct entry to the First Division for the 1903–04 season. The club were also invited to compete in the Western League, a competition which was considered secondary to the Southern League.

Argyle finished as runners-up in 1908 and 1912, before winning the League championship for the first time in 1913. The club harboured ambitions on entering the Second Division of the Football League before competitive football was put on-hold in May 1915 due to the First World War. The Southern League resumed in August 1919, but it was to be Argyle's last season as a member before the League's top division was absorbed by the Football League to create the Third Division ahead of the 1920–21 season. A year later, more clubs were added to the division and it was split in two, Third Division North and Third Division South. Argyle were placed in the latter.

The club finished as runners-up for six consecutive seasons between 1922 and 1927, before finally winning the League championship in the 1929–30 season, and promotion to the Second Division for the first time. Argyle remained there for almost twenty years before returning to the Third Division South in 1950. The club won the League championship again in the 1951–52 season, and Argyle's best season to date followed a year later. They finished fourth in the Second Division and reached the fifth round of the FA Cup. The club were relegated again in 1956 before winning another League title in the 1958–59 season, in the re-unified Third Division. Argyle's stay in the second tier of English football this time lasted almost a decade until they were relegated again in 1968. The club were promoted from the Third Division once more in 1975 as runners-up, the first time they had done so without ending the season as champions. Argyle reached the semi-finals of the FA Cup for the first time in April 1984, and were promoted from the Third Division as runners-up again in the 1985–86 season.

Argyle were relegated to the fourth tier of English football for the first time in their history at the end of the 1994–95 season, but earned promotion again the following year, this time at Wembley Stadium in the 1996 Third Division play-off final. The club won their first League championship in forty-three years at the end of the 2001–02 season, breaking numerous records in the process, including a Third Division record points tally of 102. Argyle conceded just 28 League goals that season and kept 27 clean sheets in 46 matches. Two years later, the club won the Second Division of the Football League and promotion back to the second tier, which was renamed the Championship by the League's board in the summer of 2004. Argyle's success in the 2003–04 season took their tally of titles in the third tier of English football to four, which is a divisional record. As of the end of the 2012–13 season, Plymouth Argyle Football Club has spent 40 seasons in the second tier of English football, 39 seasons in the third, and seven seasons in the fourth. The table details their achievements in all senior first team competitions, their top goalscorer(s), and average home league attendance for each completed season since their professional debut on 1 September 1903.

Table key

Key to divisions:
 SL Div 1 = Southern League First Division
 WL Div 1 = Western League First Division
 Div 3 = Football League Third Division
 Div 3S = Football League Third Division South
 Div 2 = Football League Second Division
 FLS = Football League South
 Champ = Football League Championship
 Lge 1 = Football League One
 Lge 2 = Football League Two

Key to league record:
 P = Matches played
 W = Matches won
 D = Matches drawn
 L = Matches lost
 F = Goals scored
 A = Goals conceded
 Pts = Points gained
 Pos = Final position

Key to rounds:
 R1 = First round
 R2 = Second round
 R3 = Third round
 R4 = Fourth round, etc.
 QF = Quarter-finals
 SF = Semi-finals
 GR = Group stage
 NA = Not applicable

Seasons

Footnotes

References
General

 
 
 
 
 
 

Specific

External links
 Plymouth Argyle F.C. official website
 Plymouth Argyle F.C. archive

 
Seasons
Plymouth Argyle F.C.